Hoshina is a Japanese surname. Notable people with the surname include:

, Japanese daimyō
, Japanese daimyō
, Japanese daimyō
, Japanese daimyō
, Japanese daimyō
, Japanese samurai
, Japanese daimyō
, Japanese daimyō
, Filipino-Japanese judoka

Fictional characters
, a character in the manga series Shugo Chara!
Hikaru Hoshina

See also
, a Japanese clan

Japanese-language surnames